Septa rubecula, common name : the ruby triton or the  red redbreast triton, is a species of predatory sea snail, a marine gastropod mollusk in the family Cymatiidae.

Subspecies
 Septa rubecula rebeculum
 Septa rubecula occidentale

Distribution
This species is distributed in the Indian Ocean off Chagos, the Mascarene basin and Tanzania and in the Indo-West Pacific.; also off New Caledonia.

Description
The shell size of Septa rubecula varies between 25 mm and 55 mm. These moderately small shells are commonly rather solid, ovate and vetricose. The six convex whorls are sculptured with one varix on each whorl and with spiral cords, nodules and knobs. Siphonal canal is moderately long. The external shell surface is quite variable in color. It may be bright or dark red, orange or brown with a small white or yellowish transversal band on whorls and with small white patches on varices. The outer lip is ornamented with 8–10 white prominent denticles. The columella is reddish. The inner surface of the aperture is white. The periostracum is yellowish-brown.

Habitat
Under coral rocks, on sand and coral substrate at depths of 0.5 to 145 m.

References

Bibliography
 A.G. Hinton - Guide to Australian Shells
 A.G. Hinton - Guide to Shells of Papua New Guinea
 A.G. Hinton - Shells of New Guinea & Central Pacific
 B. Dharma - Indonesian Shells I
 C. Michel - Marine Molluscs of Mauritius
 Drivas, J. & M. Jay (1988). Coquillages de La Réunion et de l'île Maurice
 F Springsteen, F. M. Leobrera - Shells of the Philippines
 G. T. Poppe - Philippine Marine Molluscs Vol. 1
 Hirofumi Kubo and Taiji Kurozumi - Molluscs of Okinawa
 R. Tucker Abbott - Seashells of South East Asia
 Thomas Henning, Jens Hemmen - Ranellidae & Personidae of the World
 ITIS: The Integrated Taxonomic Information System. Orrell T. (custodian)
 Beu, A. (2010). Catalogue of Tonnoidea. Pers. comm

Cymatiidae
Gastropods described in 1758
Taxa named by Carl Linnaeus